Presently most companies (especially in manufacturing) have total cost (TC) based pricing method. It is an age-old formula, which puts margin or markup on TC. For example,
                         Price (P) = TC / (1- M) where M is margin percentage)
[1]
TC can be divided into 2 components: - raw material (RM) and - value addition (VA), which also includes all overheads

absolute Margin (M) = P - TC or in other words margin is premium over total costs which is charged to the customer for adding value to raw material.

Before going further, a few facts, objectives and assumptions;
Fact: Every company has fixed manufacturing capacity Company objective: To maximise profit Assumption: Company faces infinite demand for its products

The problem with TC based pricing is it does not tell us how to differentiate between 2 orders. For example assume that a company is producing two products A & B,

          Product    RM      VA      TC       M      P       Absolute margin
             A        10      40     50       50%    100        50
             B        40      10     50       50%    100        50

From above table, if a company is facing A & B orders, it may consider both orders equally profitable. If criterion is margin percentage or even if absolute margin, both orders fare equally.
But are they so? Consider margin per VA, (money earned on work done) for both products, for A it is 1.25 while for B it is 5. In above method, VA for first part is 300% more than in second part and still company is charging same margin. In simpler words, A takes 4 days in manufacturing, eats-up resources and generates the same amount of money as that of B, which uses only 1 day in production (assuming 10 VA is equal to one day).

From the company’s point of view, it would like to have more of B as with fixed capacity it will be able to do a greater number of projects (=100/10= 10 B type orders) and hence total profit will be (50 x 10 = Rs. 500 for 100% utilization)
But if it is busy with A type orders, it can do only (=100/40 = 2.5 no. of orders). In this situation it will earn net profit of (50 x 2.5 = Rs. 125 for 100% utilization).

From the customer’s point of view, assuming he is making rational choice; he would like to place those orders which provide more value for less money. So based on present pricing method, he will have more tendency to place A type orders with us. Also in cases of multiple part numbers in same RFQ, he can choose to give us those parts for which we are adding more value for less money.

Doubt 2: Why do we need to change margins depending upon complexity/easiness of order and big/small size of order?

1) Complexity/easiness of order: - Before giving this logic, one would like to raise simple question,

For a processing department, which one is more costly?
a) an hour of work for a simple order or
b) an hour of work for a highly complex order
Well answer is both are same. It is because whether simple or complex, we are comparing one hour jobs.

So parameter for comparing complexity of job is number of hours taken. For a complex order, the hours taken will be more than a simpler job and hence cost will go up. This fact gets accounted in cost estimation by costing department, so why do we need to put extra margin for complex job?

2) big/small size of order: - First of all one needs to question basic assumption behind lower margins for higher orders. Common sense says that one needs to give benefit of lower costs to  customer, if he gives us larger orders. Now what are these benefits consists of:
a) less raw material price
b) less manufacturing cost
c) overheads amortized over larger population

And one does pass on all these benefits to the customer. All of these factors are covered in total cost. Since glass cost is less and one is not taking any benefit of it and charging customer the same cost what we got from supplier. Due to learning curve effect, company is taking less time to produce same number of objects and hence it is estimating fewer hours for the job (again passing on the benefit of reduced process cost to customer). Overheads will be less because of larger base and again all overheads are passed to the customer. All in all, company passes all the benefits of mass production to customer even without thinking about it.

On other hand company is still paying to production worker for his effort. Margin is premium charged on effort. So if one is still making same effort why should one ask fewer premiums for a job? One would rather do other jobs which are paying higher premium for an hour worked.

Point is that by reducing margins for larger quantity orders companies are giving double benefit to customer and which need not be given (other than due to external factors like competition etc.)

Pricing
Business architecture
Management cybernetics